Shellbrook was a provincial electoral district  for the Legislative Assembly of the province of Saskatchewan, Canada, in the area of Shellbrook, Saskatchewan, west of Prince Albert.

Created as "Prince Albert" before the 1st Saskatchewan general election in 1905, this constituency was redrawn and renamed "Shellbrook" in 1912. The riding was again redrawn and renamed "Shellbrook-Torch River" in 1982, and abolished before the 23rd Saskatchewan general election in 1995 into Shellbrook-Spiritwood and Saskatchewan Rivers. Shellbrook-Spiritwood existed from 1995 to 2003. The former Shellbrook riding is now part of the districts of Rosthern-Shellbrook and Saskatchewan Rivers.

Members of the Legislative Assembly

Prince Albert & Prince Albert County (1905 – 1912)

Shellbrook (1912 – 1982)

Shellbrook-Torch River (1982 – 1995)

Election results

Prince Albert & Prince Albert County (1905 – 1912)

|-

|- bgcolor="white"
!align="left" colspan=3|Total
!align="right"|727
!align="right"|100.00%
!align="right"|

Note: *In 1907, by order of the Legislative Assembly, 151 votes for Peter Tyerman were "set aside" and Samuel Donaldson of the Provincial Rights party was declared elected.

|-

|- bgcolor="white"
!align="left" colspan=3|Total
!align="right"|719
!align="right"|100.00%
!align="right"|

Shellbrook (1912 – 1982)

|-
 
|style="width: 130px"|Conservative
|Samuel James Donaldson
|align="right"|478
|align="right"|58.22%
|align="right"|-3.95

|- bgcolor="white"
!align="left" colspan=3|Total
!align="right"|821
!align="right"|100.00%
!align="right"|

|-

 
|Conservative
|Alexander Frederick Agnew
|align="right"|581
|align="right"|25.06%
|align="right"|-33.16

|- bgcolor="white"
!align="left" colspan=3|Total
!align="right"|2,319
!align="right"|100.00%
!align="right"|

|-

 
|Conservative
|Ralph Byron Horner
|align="right"|1,083
|align="right"|31.68%
|align="right"|+6.62
|- bgcolor="white"
!align="left" colspan=3|Total
!align="right"|3,418
!align="right"|100.00%
!align="right"|

|-

|- bgcolor="white"
!align="left" colspan=3|Total
!align="right"|3,170
!align="right"|100.00%
!align="right"|

|-

|- bgcolor="white"
!align="left" colspan=3|Total
!align="right"|4,408
!align="right"|100.00%
!align="right"|

|-

 
|Conservative
|Ralph Byron Horner
|align="right"|1,460
|align="right"|26.70%
|align="right"|-

|- bgcolor="white"
!align="left" colspan=3|Total
!align="right"|5,468
!align="right"|100.00%
!align="right"|

|-

 
|Conservative
|Alexander Frederick Agnew
|align="right"|2,209
|align="right"|22.59%
|align="right"|-4.11
|- bgcolor="white"
!align="left" colspan=3|Total
!align="right"|9,779
!align="right"|100.00%
!align="right"|

|-

|- bgcolor="white"
!align="left" colspan=3|Total
!align="right"|6,836
!align="right"|100.00%
!align="right"|

|-

|- bgcolor="white"
!align="left" colspan=3|Total
!align="right"|5,487
!align="right"|100.00%
!align="right"|

|-

|- bgcolor="white"
!align="left" colspan=3|Total
!align="right"|6,314
!align="right"|100.00%
!align="right"|

|-

|- bgcolor="white"
!align="left" colspan=3|Total
!align="right"|6,746
!align="right"|100.00%
!align="right"|

|-

|- bgcolor="white"
!align="left" colspan=3|Total
!align="right"|6,935
!align="right"|100.00%
!align="right"|

|-

|- bgcolor="white"
!align="left" colspan=3|Total
!align="right"|6,493
!align="right"|100.00%
!align="right"|

|-

|- bgcolor="white"
!align="left" colspan=3|Total
!align="right"|6,335
!align="right"|100.00%
!align="right"|

|-

|- bgcolor="white"
!align="left" colspan=3|Total
!align="right"|6,387
!align="right"|100.00%
!align="right"|

|-

|- bgcolor="white"
!align="left" colspan=3|Total
!align="right"|5,629
!align="right"|100.00%
!align="right"|

|-

|- bgcolor="white"
!align="left" colspan=3|Total
!align="right"|5,666
!align="right"|100.00%
!align="right"|

|-

|- bgcolor="white"
!align="left" colspan=3|Total
!align="right"|6,757
!align="right"|100.00%
!align="right"|

|-

|- bgcolor="white"
!align="left" colspan=3|Total
!align="right"|7,375
!align="right"|100.00%
!align="right"|

Shellbrook-Torch River (1982 – 1995)

|-

|- bgcolor="white"
!align="left" colspan=3|Total
!align="right"|8,410
!align="right"|100.00%
!align="right"|

|-

|- bgcolor="white"
!align="left" colspan=3|Total
!align="right"|8,466
!align="right"|100.00%
!align="right"|

|-

|- bgcolor="white"
!align="left" colspan=3|Total
!align="right"|7,633
!align="right"|100.00%
!align="right"|

See also 
Prince Albert – Northwest Territories territorial electoral district (1870–1905)

Electoral district (Canada)
List of Saskatchewan provincial electoral districts
List of Saskatchewan general elections
List of political parties in Saskatchewan
Shellbrook, Saskatchewan

References 

 Saskatchewan Archives Board – Saskatchewan Election Results By Electoral Division

Former provincial electoral districts of Saskatchewan
Politics of Prince Albert, Saskatchewan